Isaac Claude Michaelson (1903–1982) was an Israeli ophthalmologist and member of the Israel Academy of Sciences and Humanities.

Biography 
Michaelson was born in 1903 in Edinburgh, Scotland, United Kingdom. He studied ophthalmology at the University of Glasgow and the University of Edinburgh, graduating in 1927.

The development of the retina was the basis of much of his research and of many of his publications. Michaelson worked as a pathologist in an eye disease hospital in Glasgow and served as a lecturer at the University of Glasgow.

During World War II,  he was an advisor to the British Army on ophthalmology and served in Egypt.

In 1948, he completed his doctorate and emigrated with his family to Israel. He was initially an advisor to the Israel Defense Forces and worked as an eye surgeon.

In 1949, Michaelson was named director of department of ophthalmology at Rambam Hospital, Haifa and, in 1954, became director of the department of ophthalmology at Hadassah University Hospital in Jerusalem, which subsequently became, under his management, the Ophthalmology Research Center. He was also appointed as a professor at the medical school of the Hebrew University of Jerusalem.

Much of Michaelson's work was to assist developing countries, particularly in Africa, and in 1971 he initiated the International Conference on the Prevention of Blindness. After his retirement from Hadassah Hospital in 1973, he acted in blind rehabilitation.

He established the Jerusalem Institute for the Prevention of Blindness.

Awards 
 In 1960, Michaelson was awarded the Israel Prize, in medicine.

References

See also 
 List of Israel Prize recipients

1903 births
1982 deaths
British Jews
Scottish Jews
20th-century Israeli Jews
Alumni of the University of Glasgow
Alumni of the University of Edinburgh
Academics of the University of Glasgow
Academic staff of the Hebrew University of Jerusalem
20th-century Scottish medical doctors
Israel Prize in medicine recipients
Members of the Israel Academy of Sciences and Humanities
Israeli ophthalmologists
British emigrants to Israel